George Thomas DiCarlo (born July 13, 1963) is an American former competition swimmer who won the gold medal and broke the Olympic record in the 400-meter freestyle event at the 1984 Summer Olympics in Los Angeles.  At the 1984 Olympics, he also won the silver medal in the 1,500-meter freestyle.

DiCarlo attended University of Arizona, and competed for the Arizona Wildcats swimming and diving team.

See also
 List of Olympic medalists in swimming (men)
 List of University of Arizona people

References

1963 births
Living people
American male freestyle swimmers
American people of Italian descent
Arizona Wildcats men's swimmers
Olympic gold medalists for the United States in swimming
Olympic silver medalists for the United States in swimming
Sportspeople from St. Petersburg, Florida
Swimmers at the 1984 Summer Olympics
Medalists at the 1984 Summer Olympics